CNN3 may refer to:
CNN3 (gene)
Shelburne/Fisher Field Aerodrome, Ontario, Canada: TC LID CNN3